KVSH-LP (101.9 FM) is a radio station licensed to serve the community of Vashon, Washington. The station is owned by Voice of Vashon. It airs a community radio format.

The station was assigned the call sign KVOI-LP by the Federal Communications Commission on March 3, 2014. A week later, on March 10, the station changed its call sign to KVSH-LP

References

External links
 Official Website
 

VSH-LP
VSH-LP
Radio stations established in 2014
2014 establishments in Washington (state)
Community radio stations in the United States
King County, Washington